Marsha Mateyka Gallery is a fine arts gallery in Washington, DC. The gallery was established in 1983 by art historian Marsha Perry Mateyka. The gallery focuses generally on national and regional contemporary artists. The gallery is located at 2012 R Street NW,  Washington DC 20009.

Artists represented 
As one of the oldest art galleries in the city, the gallery represents approximately 20 well-known contemporary artists, including Jae Ko, Jim Sanborn, Athena Tacha, William T. Wiley, Christopher French, Sam Gilliam, and the Estates of Gene Davis and Nathan Oliveira.

Critical reception 
Exhibitions at the gallery have been widely reviewed over the years by both local newspapers such as The Washington Post, Washington City Paper, and The Washington Times, as well as by national art magazines. The gallery can also be credited with playing a pivotal part in the revival in the interest in the work of major American artist Sam Gilliam, whom the gallery has represented for several decades.

References

External links 
 

Art museums and galleries in Washington, D.C.
Contemporary art galleries in the United States
Art galleries established in 1983
1983 establishments in Washington, D.C.